The Valletta International Baroque Festival is one of the largest music festivals of Malta. It was founded by its present Artistic Director Kenneth Zammit Tabona in 2013. The programmatic focus is on baroque and early music.

History
Since its establishment in 2013, the Valletta International Baroque Festival is held every year in January and organized by the direction of Manoel Theatre. The concerts and opera performances are presented in several Baroque buildings in the city of Valletta.

Among the artists who have performed at the festival are Mahan Esfahani, Philippe Herreweghe, Christophe Rousset, and Jordi Savall.

On 26 January 2017, Reuben Pace's Concertino for guitar, harpsichord and orchestra was premiered at Manoel Theatre under the slogan Inspired by Baroque with the Malta Philharmonic Orchestra under the direction of Michelle Castelletti as well as the soloists Johanna Beisteiner (guitar) and Joanne Camilleri (harpsichord). It was the first world premiere during the Valletta International Baroque Festival and signaled an artistic expansion of the festival's programme to contemporary works inspired by baroque music.

References

External links
 Festival official website

2013 establishments in Malta
Recurring events established in 2013
Early music festivals
Music festivals in Malta
Annual events in Malta
Winter events in Malta
Culture in Valletta